Kanikkaran are a tribal community found in the southern parts of Kerala and Tamil Nadu states in India. According to 2011 census there are 24,000 Kanikkars, living in several districts of Kerala and Tamil Nadu. They dwell in forests or near to forests in Thiruvananthapuram and Kollam in Kerala, and Kanyakumari and Tirunelveli districts in Tamil Nadu.

Though they cultivate everything and make agriculture as the main profession, they have a special liking for fishing and hunting. Literacy is estimated to be around 53.84%. Kaanikkar Nritham is a form of group dance performed as a rural offering.

The Kanikkars are semi-nomadic, living in temporary huts of bamboo and reeds. These are generally situated on hillsides. Previously they practiced slash-and-burn cultivation, but this was banned in the late 19th century, who assigned certain areas of the forest for their exclusive use. Some work on planter estates, others in manufacturing bows and arrows. They shoot heated arrows at elephants from huts in the trees when watching over crops. These huts are easily constructed, with bamboo walls and a thatched leaf roof. They are built 50 feet above the ground, and are connected to the ground with a ladder. The community also collects minor forest produce, especially honey. The Kanikkars climb ropes at the base of cliffs where nests are located, and collect honey and put it in baskets.

Subdivisions of Kanikkars are known as Ilams, or families: 5 are Machampi (brother-in-law ilams), who are endogamous, and 5 are Annantampi (brother ilams), who are exogamous.

The Kanikkars live in communities under a Muttakani, a headman. They inherit property father-to-son, but a share of the property goes to a nephew.

Their chief deity is Sasta, but the community worships a series of other forest deities. They worship their gods twice a year. On the morning of the festival people take plantains and rice to the headman's house. Most of the rice is husked and ground to flour by the boys and men, and is then taken to a clearing where a row of plantain leaves is laid. A Kanikkar spreads rice over these leaves, and above puts plantains. An officiating priest burns incense, and all pray for goodwill of their fields. When the land is first cleared for cultivation, the headman is given rice and coconuts and clears part of the field.

History
Concerning their genealogy and genesis they have interesting stories. Aryans who moved from north to south called them Kanikkar, which literally means landlords, descendants of the Kings, gave their offerings to Attingal King.  Thus they are so called. Another story concerning them is that they derived the name Malayarayan from Hindu mythological Sage, Agasthya. They claim that once they were the rulers of the area comprising Trivandrum, Kollam, parts of Kanyakumari dist and claim that they were here even before the Dravidians, and claim to be the original people of the land. It is a fact that they had a special place among the rulers of Travancore and they were treated without any discrimination and did not come under the untouchability practiced in Kerala. They had free and unrestricted access to all the temples including Sreepadmanabha temple since time immemorial their children were admitted in palace run schools including Kilimanoor even before abolition of caste system and Kshetrapravesana Vilambaram.
They were not confined to hills alone, they were present in the areas nearer to the coast like Kazhakuttam, Kulathoor, Uloor, etc.

Language
The Kanikkaran language is closely related to Tamil, but has significant Malayalam influence.

See also
 Kanikkaran language
 Amboori Village

References

External links

Social groups of India
Scheduled Tribes of Kerala
Scheduled Tribes of India
Scheduled Tribes of Tamil Nadu
Indigenous peoples of South Asia